Woytkowskia is a genus of longhorn beetles of the subfamily Lamiinae, containing the following species:

 Woytkowskia gruberi Martins & Galileo, 1992
 Woytkowskia scorpiona Lane, 1966
 Woytkowskia travassosi Lane, 1971

References

Hemilophini